Julien Antomarchi (born 16 May 1984) is a French former professional cyclist, who rode professionally between 2011 and 2021 for ,  and .

Major results

2006
 1st Gara Ciclistica Millionaria
 4th Overall Tour de la Somme
1st Stage 1
2008
 1st Stage 2 Les 3 Jours de Vaucluse
 3rd Overall Tour de Bretagne
1st Stage 4
2009
 1st Stage 3 Tour Alsace
2010
 1st Stage 4 Ronde de l'Oise
 4th Overall Kreiz Breizh Elites
1st Stage 2
 4th Grand Prix des Marbriers
2011
 2nd Overall Tour du Haut Var
1st Stage 2
 2nd Overall Cinturó de l'Empordà
 3rd Paris–Camembert
 4th Grand Prix of Aargau Canton
 7th Duo Normand (with Thomas Vaubourzeix)
 8th Prueba Villafranca de Ordizia
 9th Grand Prix d'Ouverture La Marseillaise
2012
 10th Overall Étoile de Bessèges
2013
 2nd Overall Mzansi Tour
1st Stage 1
 4th Paris–Camembert
 10th Overall Étoile de Bessèges
2014
 1st  Overall Tour of Hainan
1st Stages 4 & 7
 4th Paris–Troyes
 5th Tour of Almaty
2015
 1st  Mountains classification Four Days of Dunkirk
 1st Prologue Tour Alsace
 3rd Overall Tour des Pays de Savoie
 5th Tour du Finistère
 5th Tour du Doubs
2016
 6th Grand Prix de Plumelec-Morbihan
 10th Overall Étoile de Bessèges
2017
 3rd Overall Circuit des Ardennes
 4th Tour du Finistère
 9th Tour du Doubs
2018
 1st Grand Prix de la ville de Nogent-sur-Oise
 3rd Overall Tour de Bretagne
1st Stage 4
 4th Boucles de l'Aulne
 5th Time trial, National Road Championships
 7th Overall Tour Poitou-Charentes en Nouvelle-Aquitaine
 9th Overall Four Days of Dunkirk
2019
 3rd Time trial, National Road Championships
 9th Overall Four Days of Dunkirk
 9th Overall Boucles de la Mayenne

References

External links

1984 births
Living people
French male cyclists
Cyclists from Marseille